The Yenisey Range is a range of mountains in Siberia. Administratively the range is part of the Krasnoyarsk Krai of the Russian Federation. The nearest town is Severo-Yeniseysk.

The mountains have granite intrusions that are associated with gold deposits, as well as iron ore, bauxite, magnesite and talc.

Geography
The Yenisey Range is a subrange of the Central Siberian Plateau. It is a relatively low range, cut across by swampy intermontane basins. The range stretches along the right bank of the Yenisey in the southwestern edge of the plateau, between the valley of the Kan River in the south and the Stony Tunguska in the north, beyond which rises the Tunguska Plateau. 

The northern part of the range is the widest and has the highest elevations. The Angara River flows across the area of the range to join the Yenisey off its western slopes. The Big Pit River has its sources in the range.

Flora
The slopes of the mountains are smooth and are covered with taiga. The tops of the higher peaks are bald with clumps of small shrubs and areas of scree.

See also
List of mountains and hills of Russia
Yenisey Fold Belt

References

External links
 

Landforms of Krasnoyarsk Krai
Central Siberian Plateau